John James Matlock III (October 19, 1944 — January 13, 2012) was an American football center who played for the New York Jets, Cincinnati Bengals, Atlanta Falcons, and Buffalo Bills of the National Football League (NFL). He also played for Birmingham Vulcans of the World Football League (WFL). He played college football at University of Miami.

References 

1944 births
2012 deaths
Players of American football from Louisville, Kentucky
American football centers
Miami Hurricanes football players
New York Jets players
Cincinnati Bengals players
Atlanta Falcons players
Buffalo Bills players
Birmingham Vulcans players